General Kane (known as General Caine before 1986) was an American music group fronted by Mitch McDowell (born Mitchell Leon McDowell on June 29, 1954, in San Bernardino, California; died January 22, 1992, in San Bernardino).

Overview
McDowell took the professional name General Kane in tribute to an officer who had supported his artistic ambitions when he was at military school. After leaving that institution, he formed the group Booty People. They released one album for MCA Records. Mitch assembled an eight-piece funk group and signed with Groove Time Records in 1978, releasing two albums: Let Me In (1978) and Get Down Attack (1980).

The group then moved to Tabu Records. General Caine's third album entitled Girls features the hit song "For Lovers Only". The radio station 93.1 FM WZAK in Cleveland (Ohio) penned "For Lovers Only" as a theme song for their late night segment with the same title. Their debut single for the Tabu label and the fourth album Dangerous with many songwriting chores, were done by  Johnny Guitar Carson.

After a brief appearance at Capitol Records with one single released called "Where's the Beef?" (a popular catch phrase at that time), a slimmed down version of the group with new writers and producers signed a recording contract with Motown Records in the mid-1980s. With a slightly new name (from General Caine to General Kane to reflect the changes in the band's lineup) and sound, they debuted for the new Motown Records label with the album In Full Chill (1986). "Crack Killed Applejack" was an uncompromising reflection of drug addiction on the inner city streets and reached number 12 in the black music charts despite being barred from airplay. Subsequent releases mellowed General Kane's approach without losing their commitment to the basic rap sound of the late 1980s. The group's album Wide Open included a romantic ballad, "Close Your Eyes", which featured vocals from two of the group's less prominent members, Cheryl McDowell and Danny Macon.

Mitch McDowell pursued a career in law enforcement as a bail bondsman after leaving the music industry. He was murdered in January 1992 along with a nephew, Akili John Davis, 18, who worked in his office. Police noted that the office safe was empty.

General Kane's catalogue remained in print through the efforts of their former producer, Grover Wimberly III, who runs his own label, Groove Time Records.

Discography

Albums
 Let Me In (1978)
 Get Down Attack (1980)
 Girls (1982)
 Dangerous (1983)
 In Full Chill (1986)
 Wide Open (1987)

Singles

References

External links
 
 General Caine at Discogs.
 General Kane at Discogs.

American funk musical groups
American soul musical groups
Musical groups from California
1954 births
1992 deaths
20th-century American musicians